Edentiella is a genus of small air-breathing land snails, terrestrial pulmonate gastropod mollusks in the subfamily Trochulininae of the family Hygromiidae, the hairy snails and their allies.

Species
 Edentiella bakowskii (Poliński, 1924)
 Edentiella bielzi (E. A. Bielz, 1859)
 Edentiella edentula (Draparnaud, 1805)
 Edentiella filicina (L. Pfeiffer, 1841)
 Edentiella leucozona (C. Pfeiffer, 1828)
 Edentiella lurida (C. Pfeiffer, 1828)
 Edentiella subtecta (Poliński, 1929)

References

 Bank, R. A. (2017). Classification of the Recent terrestrial Gastropoda of the World. Last update: July 16th, 2017

 Hygromiidae